Tanya Anne Crosby (born June 5, 1962) is a Spanish-American writer of romance novels.  A New York Times bestselling author, she is a five-time nominee for a Romantic Times Career Achievement Award. Her novels have been translated into Spanish, Italian, French, Russian and Chinese.

Biography

Personal life
Tanya Anne Crosby was born on June 5, 1962 in Rota in Cadiz, Andalusia, Spain. Her mother is Spanish and her father an American military, and she still proudly declares a dual citizenship. She grew up as a military brat with disparity in cultures.

Tanya Anne is married and has two children. She currently resides in Traverse City, Michigan.

Writing career
Tanya Anne Crosby published her first romance novel "Angel of fire" in 1992 for Avon Books for which she was hailed as "one of Avon's fastest rising stars". A New York Times bestselling author, she has written numerous novels, which have graced bestseller lists, including The New York Times, USA Today and Waldenbooks and B Dalton's Top 10. She has received high-level publicity in magazines, such as People, Romantic Times and Publishers Weekly, and her books have been translated into eight languages: Russian, Italian, Chinese, French, German, Spanish, Dutch and Portuguese.

Her fifth historical romance, Once Upon a Kiss, launched the Avon Romantic Treasures line. Tanya is also an award-winning journalist and editor.

After a 10-year hiatus, she returned with her first contemporary romantic suspense for Kensington. SPEAK NO EVIL, her first romantic suspense novel was released in 2013 for which she appeared in the USA Today. Dedicated to the historicals that gave her a name and a loyal following, she returned to the genre with a brand-new historical series, entitled The Guardians of the Stone. Additionally, Tanya has embarked upon a new storytelling endeavor. Her first title for The Story Plant is titled THE GIRL WHO STAYED and will be released April 2016.

Tanya has now written for The Story Plant, Kensington Publishing, Harlequin, and Avon Books/Harper Collins, where her fifth book Once Upon a Kiss launched the Avon Romantic Treasures line.

Bibliography

Single Novels
ANGEL OF FIRE; Avon Books, Apr 1992
SAGEBRUSH BRIDE; Avon Books, Jun 1993
VIKING'S PRIZE; Avon Books, Apr 1994
A CHRISTMAS TOGETHER; Avon Books, Oct 1994
ONCE UPON A KISS; Avon Books, Feb 1, 1995
KISSED;  Avon Books, Dec 1, 1995
THE MACKINNON'S BRIDE; Avon Books, Jun 1, 1996
MARRIED AT MIDNIGHT; Avon Books, Sep 1996
LYON'S GIFT; Avon Books, Jun 1, 1997
PERFECT IN MY SIGHT; Avon Books, May 1, 1998
ON BENDED KNEE; Avon Books, Jan 1, 1999
HAPPILY EVER AFTER;Avon Books, Nov 9, 1999
LION HEART; Avon Books, 2000
THE IMPOSTOR'S KISS; Harlequin Books,  Dec 2003
THE IMPOSTOR PRINCE; Harlequin Books Sep 2006
SPEAK NO EVIL; Kensington Books Mar 2013
TELL NO LIES; Kensington Books Mar 2014
HIGHLAND FIRE; Oliver-Heber Books Jan 2014
HIGHLAND STEEL; Oliver-Heber Books Oct 2014
HIGHLAND STORM; Oliver-Heber Books Dec 2015
THE WINTER STONE; Oliver-Heber Books April 2014
THE GIRL WHO STAYED; The Story Plant April 2016

Novellas
LADY'S MAN; Oliver-Heber Books, April 2012
HIGHLAND SONG; Oliver-Heber Books, 2013
ONCE UPON A HIGHLAND LEGEND;Oliver-Heber Books, d 2014
MISCHIEF & MISTLETOE; Oliver-Heber Books, 2013
MACKINNONS' HOPE; Oliver-Heber Books, Oct 2015

MacKinnon-Brodie Saga Series
The MacKinnon's Bride, Avon Books 1996/Jun
Lion's Gift, Avon Books, 1997/Jun
One Bended Knee, Avon Books, 1999/Ene
Lion Heart, Avon Books, 2000/Jul

The Impostors Series
The Impostor Kiss, Harlequin Enterprises, 2003/Dec
The Impostor Prince, Harlequin Enterprises, 2006/Sep

Anthologies in collaboration
"Heaven's Gate" in A Christmas Together (with Jane Bonander, Jennifer Horsman and Joan Johnston), Avon Books, 1994/Oct
"A kiss After Midnight" in Married at Midnight (with Kathleen E. Woodiwiss, Jo Beverley, and Samantha James) Avon Books, 1996/Sep

References

External links
Tanya Anne Crosby in Fantastic Fiction

20th-century American novelists
21st-century American novelists
American romantic fiction writers
American women novelists
1962 births
Living people
20th-century American women writers
21st-century American women writers